Boyle is a Scottish and Irish surname of Norman origin.

Boyle may also refer to:

Places

Extraterrestrial
Boyle (crater), a lunar crater
11967 Boyle, an asteroid

Terrestrial
Boyle, Alberta, a village in Alberta, Canada
Boyle, County Roscommon, in Ireland
Boyle, Kansas, U.S.
Boyle, Mississippi, in the United States of America
Boyle Abbey, Historic national monument in Ireland
Boyle County, Kentucky,  in the United States of America

Other uses 
Boyle's law, in physics, one of the gas laws; named after Irish natural philosopher Robert Boyle
Boyle's machine, used in the administration of general anaesthesia to patients
Clan Boyle, a Scottish clan
USS Boyle (DD-600), U.S. Navy destroyer

See also 
 Boyle River (disambiguation)